The Oregonian Railway was a  narrow gauge railroad in the Willamette Valley in the U.S. state of Oregon.

History
A group of Scot capitalists formed the Oregonian Railway Company, Limited after purchasing the bankrupt Dayton, Sheridan and Grande Ronde Railroad in 1879.

The first changes made were to move the Dayton terminal, on the Yamhill River, to Fulquartz Landing on the Willamette River.  On the opposite bank of the Willamette, the railroad built Ray's Landing.  This became the north terminus of the narrow gauge line on the east side of the Willamette valley.  The line connected towns such as St. Paul, Woodburn, Silverton, Brownsville, and Coburg.

The railroad also expanded the westside line south to reach Perrydale, Dallas, Monmouth, Independence and Airlie.  The stop at the end of the line was named after the Earl of Airlie, the leader of the Scot capitalists.

Revenues were dropping, and by 1886 or 1887 the railroad granted a long-term lease to Henry Villard of the Oregon & California Railroad.  In later years, Villard would leave the Oregon railroad scene and the line came to be under the control of Southern Pacific Railroad.

See also
List of defunct Oregon railroads
Portland and Willamette Valley Railway
William Reid (Scottish businessman)

References

Culp, Edwin D. (1972). Stations West, The Story of the Oregon Railways, Bonanza Books, Page 65.

1879 establishments in Oregon
3 ft gauge railways in the United States
Defunct Oregon railroads
History of transportation in Oregon
Marion County, Oregon
Narrow gauge railroads in Oregon
Transportation in Polk County, Oregon
Transportation in Yamhill County, Oregon